James Forrest (3 February 1907 – 2 April 1981) was a Scotland international rugby union player.

Rugby Union career

Amateur career

He played for Glasgow Academicals.

Provincial career

He was capped for Glasgow District.

International career

He was capped three times for Scotland.

References

1907 births
1981 deaths
Scottish rugby union players
Scotland international rugby union players
Glasgow Academicals rugby union players
Glasgow District (rugby union) players
Rugby union wings